Awudua is a town near Tarkwa in the Prestea Huni-Valley Municipality in the Western Region of Ghana. The chief of the area is Nana Kobina Angu II.

Institution 

 Awudua Nkwanta Anglican Basic School
 Awudua Health Centre

Notable native 

 Deaconess Margaret Badu Tobbin, mother of Nana Amo Tobbin I (Executive Chairman of Tobinco Group of Companies)

References 

Western Region (Ghana)
Communities in Ghana